Romulus is a city in Wayne County in the U.S. state of Michigan.  The population was 23,989 at the 2010 census.  Romulus is a western suburb of Metro Detroit and is also considered part of the Downriver collection of communities.  It is most notable as the location of the Detroit Metropolitan Airport, a major hub for Delta Air Lines.

History
The first white settler in Romulus was Samuel Polyne, a French-Canadian, who settled on section 2 in 1826, though he left soon after the township was organized in 1835.

The first settler in the area that was the village of Romulus prior to the 1865 annexation of the whole village and township into one city was Samuel McMath, who moved from New York state to the area in 1827.  He improved land and planned to bring his family to settle there, but he died before he could carry out this plan.

Solomon Whitaker, Charles and Joseph Pulcifer located in the area in 1830, and in 1833, Jenks Pullen and his six sons settled at what became known as "Pullen's Corners" (located in section 19 at the intersection that is now commonly called "Five Points"). Pullen's Corners was platted in 1836. The community later took on the name of the township.

The township of Romulus was set off from a part of Huron Township by an Act of the Michigan Territorial Council on March 17, 1835, and the first township meeting was held on April 16, 1835, two years before the State of Michigan was admitted in to the Union (1837), in the house of Joseph T. Pullen. The first supervisor was David J. Pullen. The township's name was changed to "Wayne" on March 19, 1845, but was changed back to Romulus on January 16, 1848.

Romulus became incorporated as a city in 1970.

Village of Romulus
The village of Romulus was platted on the Lansing B. Misner estate in 1871.

Underground Railroad stops
Romulus was a stop of the Underground Railroad in the 1800s when slaves fled the inhumane conditions of plantations in the South to the free states of the North. There were two stops in Romulus and those structures are still intact to this day.
 Samuel Kingsley Home is a famous historic landmark in Romulus. During slave times, Samuel R. Kingsley lived in a house on Ozga Rd near Pullens Corners, what is today known as Five Points. He hid slaves in an underground cellar. Today, the house is located on Hunt Street across from the Romulus Historical Museum. The address to the house was 37426 S. Huron River Drive.
 The White Church at the Pullens Corner / Five Points was also an underground railroad stop. Today, the church, which is now called 5 Points Church, still sits at the corner.

Preston
Preston was located in the north-east part of Romulus. It had a post office from 1899 to 1906.

Airliner incidents
On August 16, 1987, Romulus was the site of the Northwest Airlines Flight 255 disaster, in which the plane serving the flight crashed into an overpass bridge and exploded just seconds after taking off.  The crash killed all but one of the 155 passengers and crew and two more people on the roadway.  A memorial for the victims is at the crash site at the Interstate 94 and Middlebelt Road interchange.

On December 25, 2009, another Northwest plane, Flight 253, suffered an unsuccessful bombing incident as it approached Metro Airport. Nigerian man Umar Farouk Abdulmutallab from Al-Qaeda in the Arabian Peninsula was convicted of eight criminal counts and sentenced to four life sentences plus 50 years without parole.

Chemical plant explosion
On August 9, 2005 at approximately 9:30 p.m., the EQ Recovery Plant caught fire. Citizens within  radius were forced to evacuate their homes. Romulus and Wayne fire crews and crews from neighboring communities managed to put out the fire after letting it burn down a little bit. Chemical-filled smoke filled the sky, causing respiratory problems. Many citizens from both Romulus and Wayne were taken to Oakwood Annapolis Hospital (now Beaumont Hospital-Wayne), about two miles from the explosion site. No one was injured.

Geography

Romulus is in the south-central portion of Wayne County. Interstate 94 (I-94) and I-275 run through the city.

The City of Romulus is bordered to the north by Van Born Road, to the south by Pennsylvania Road, to the east by Inkster Road, and to the west by Hannan Road.

Demographics

2010 census
As of the census of 2010, there were 23,989 people, 8,975 households, and 6,135 families living in the city. The racial makeup of the city was 50.5% White, 43% African American, 0.5% Native American, 1.1% Asian, 0.1% Pacific Islander, 0.9% from other races, and 3.9% from two or more races. Hispanic or Latino of any race were 3.0% of the population.

There were 8,975 households, of which 37.8% had children under the age of 18 living with them, 40.7% were married couples living together, 21.1% had a female householder with no husband present, 6.6% had a male householder with no wife present, and 31.6% were non-families. 26.0% of all households were made up of individuals, and 8.2% had someone living alone who was 65 years of age or older. The average household size was 2.64 and the average family size was 3.16.

The median age in the city was 36.2 years. 26.8% of residents were under the age of 18; 9.2% were between the ages of 18 and 24; 27.4% were from 25 to 44; 27% were from 45 to 64; and 9.8% were 65 years of age or older. The populace was 48.4% male and 51.6% female.

2000 census
As of the census of 2000, there were 22,979 people, 8,439 households, and 5,941 families living in the city. The racial makeup of the city was 65.36% White, 29.99% African American, 0.54% Native American, 0.59% Asian, 0.09% Pacific Islander, 0.81% from other races, and 2.63% from two or more races. Hispanic or Latino of any race were 2.01% of the population.

There were 8,439 households, out of which 36.7% had children under the age of 18 living with them, 46.5% were married couples living together, 18.5% had a female householder with no husband present, and 29.6% were non-families. 23.8% of all households were made up of individuals, and 7.2% had someone living alone who was 65 years of age or older.  The average household size was 2.70 and the average family size was 3.19.

In the cities population consists of 29.2% under the age of 18, 8.4% from 18 to 24, 31.7% from 25 to 44, 22.8% from 45 to 64, and 7.9% who were 65 years of age or older.  The median age was 33 years. For every 100 females, there were 95.1 males.  For every 100 females age 18 and over, there were 92.6 males.

The median income for a household in the city was $45,088, and the median income for a family was $51,497. Males had a median income of $41,372 versus $27,517 for females. The per capita income for the city was $19,679.  About 10.6% of families and 12.6% of the population were below the poverty line, including 16.8% of those under age 18 and 12.4% of those age 65 or over.

Government and infrastructure

City government
The elected city officials for the City of Romulus as of November 2021 (all terms end in 2025):

Wayne County Airport Authority
The Wayne County Airport Authority has its headquarters in the former L.C. Smith Terminal at Detroit Metro Airport in Romulus. It also has an operational police department, which its headquarters is located in the 610 building of the airport on the East service Drive, near the L.C. Smith building.

Infrastructure
The United States Postal Service operates the Romulus-Carl W. Morris Post Office located in downtown on Hunt Street and Goddard Road.

In 1975, General Motors, opened the Romulus Engine plant on Ecorse Road. The facility produces V6 engines and 10-speed automatic  transmissions for a plethora of Chevrolet, Buick, GMC, and Cadillac vehicles.

In 2018, major online retailer Amazon opened its DTW1 Fulfillment Center, north of Metro Airport near Ecorse and Vining Roads. Approximately 1,600 workers are employed at the site.

Romulus has a variety of small businesses throughout the city including hotels, bars, and restaurants. Retail is scarce in the city with the exception of a few pharmacies and small discount retailers. Due to the lack of major grocery retailers and numerous failed attempts to bring in new stores to the food desert community, most citizens have to travel to adjacent cities including Van Buren Township and Taylor to go to more prominent supermarket chains.

Parks and recreation
After a failed city millage in February 2011, city officials had to close all of the city parks in order to keep the city financially stable. However, the Downtown Development Authority were willing to maintain the operations of Mary Ann Banks Park & Historical Park, reopening the park in Spring 2011. By 2015, the city's finances had rebounded and with determination from city officials and citizens, most of the city's parks have reopened with improvements and even opening a new park - including:
 Elmer Johnson Park - located on Ozga Rd, between McBride Street and Tyler Road
 Eugenio Fernandez Park - located in the city's north side on Columbus Street, south of Avalon Avenue 
 Mary Ann Banks Park - located near Five Points in Romulus
 Oakbrook Neighborhood Park - near Spain Avenue and Colbert Street, south of Eureka Road
 Downtown Historical Park - Hunt Street & Goddard Road in Downtown Romulus.
 St. Johns Lodge No.#44 Park - located on the northeast side at the corner of Beverly and Henry Ruff Roads; formerly Park #1

The Romulus Athletic Center, located at 35765 Northline Road, is a facility for recreation and conferences. It opened on April 1, 2008.

Economy

RKA Petroleum Companies

Education

The Romulus Community School District serves and educates the children in the City of Romulus and other communities. The district is made up of a high school (Romulus Senior High School), a middle school, an early childhood center, and four elementary schools - Barth, Halecreek, Romulus, and Wick.

A portion is instead within the Wayne-Westland Community Schools. It is zoned to Roosevelt-McGrath Elementary School in Wayne, Adams Upper Elementary School in Westland, Franklin Middle School in Wayne, and Wayne Memorial High School in Wayne.

Summit Academy Schools and Metro Charter Academy are charter schools that serves students in the Brownstown and Romulus areas respectfully.

The Roman Catholic Archdiocese of Detroit formerly operated the St. Aloysius School in Romulus.

In popular culture
Released on his 2003 album entitled "Michigan", Sufjan Stevens recorded a single titled "Romulus". 
In 2010, "Meet Monica Velour", an independent comedy drama movie, was partially filmed in Romulus along with other cities in the Detroit area.
Alabama Crimson Tide men's basketball coach Nate Oats coached and taught at Romulus Senior High School from 2002 to 2013.

Notable people
 Charley Lau - professional baseball player and hitting coach
 John Long - professional basketball player
 Grant Long - professional basketball player, nephew of John Long
 Terry Mills - professional basketball player
 Fred Russell - professional football player
 Frank Sacka - professional baseball player (Washington Senators (1901-1960))
 Sufjan Stevens - musician

Notes

References

External links

Romulus Community Schools
Detroit Metro Airport

 
Cities in Wayne County, Michigan
Metro Detroit
1835 establishments in Michigan Territory
Populated places established in 1835